TrimTabs Investment Research, Inc. is a leading independent institutional research firm focused on equity market liquidity based in Sausalito, California.

Business description
The bread and butter of TrimTabs Investment Research is their innovative and long-standing focus on equity market liquidity.  The essential premise of their approach is that stock prices are a function of liquidity—the number of shares available to buy and the amount of money available to buy them—rather than fundamental value.  Like the prices of any tradable good, the prices of stocks are driven by the supply and demand of shares and money.

When the supply of shares increases, all else being equal, this translates to lower stock prices.  Conversely, decreasing supply is bullish. When there are fewer available shares, this translates to higher stock prices (more money available to chase fewer shares). Although TrimTabs compiles data sets and offers analyses, it primarily uses supply and demand indicators to create trading strategies (listed below) that generate alpha.

Reports

In addition to comprehensive daily liquidity updates, TrimTabs publishes four reports that each come out on a weekly basis: The Weekly Liquidity Review, The Weekly Flow Report, The Weekly International Liquidity Review, and the Weekly Asset Allocation Report.  In addition it offers two daily reports: the Overnight Liquidity Update and the Daily Liquidity Report.

The Weekly Liquidity Review is a publication that offers the broadest overview of the supply and demand dynamics of the U.S. stock market.  It focuses on in-depth investment flows (demand) and corporate liquidity flows (supply) as well as macroeconomic trends.  The investment flows include weekly updates that give investors short- and long-term trading signals based on the current and longer-term trends that TrimTabs observes in the U.S. and global stock markets.  It also includes information on several financial model portfolios and the calls associated with each of the portfolios.  The Weekly Liquidity Review is an excellent introduction to TrimTabs research for new clients and is ideal for macro managers and equity fund managers.

The Weekly Flow Report can include a quantitative focus, fund flows and sentiment indicators, analysis of short interest and commitments of traders, and hedge fund manager sentiment.

The Weekly International Liquidity Review includes fund flow and sentiment indicators for the following countries/regions: China, Developed Emerging Markets, Europe, Japan, Latin America and Pacific Asia ex-Japan. Also in this report are weekly updates of China margin debt and new account openings as well as fund flow and performance of international mutual funds and exchange-traded funds.

The Weekly Asset Allocation Report offers five tactical asset allocation portfolios with varying levels of risk, from conservative to aggressive. The portfolios apply TrimTabs’ proprietary research on mutual funds and ETFs. This report is most appropriate for financial advisors, retail brokers, and individual investors.

The Daily Liquidity Report is a quantitative report which provides a convenient summary of the most important TrimTabs liquidity data.  It includes daily, monthly, and annual data on corporate actions, including insider trading; fund flows, including the flows of mutual funds and ETFs broken down by asset class, style, industry, and Morningstar category; and the TrimTabs Demand Index, a proprietary market timing indicator based on fund flow and sentiment variables. This report is most appropriate for quantitative analysts and more active traders.

In addition, TrimTabs offers eight model trading portfolios: The TrimTabs Demand Index Model Portfolio, U.S. Equity ETF Model Portfolio, the U.S. Sector Model Portfolio, the Nasdaq Model Portfolio, the Country Model Portfolio, the Bond Model Portfolio, the High Yield Bond Model Portfolio, and the Precious Metals Model Portfolio.

Supply
The supply of shares is tracked on a daily basis from the announced actions of companies in the stock market, who are the biggest players in the stock market because they actively control the number of shares available for investors to buy.  Supply can shrink by the amount of corporate buying that takes place (cash takeovers and new stock buybacks), and can grow as companies either sell new shares (IPOs) or introduce new shares to the market in the form of follow-ons, secondaries, and convertibles.

Another way of describing the supply of shares in the market is to call it the U.S. equity float. The change in supply is a change in the float.  TrimTabs developed a formula for estimating the change in float by this equation: Float = New Offerings + Net Insider Selling – 2/3 New Cash Takeovers – 1/3 Completed Cash Takeovers – New Stock Buybacks.

The S&P 500 has frequently moved in the direction that the change in the float as estimated by TrimTabs would predict. In the 20 years from 1995 through 2014, the S&P 500 rose in 13 of the 15 years that the estimated float contracted. The S&P 500 fell in 3 of the 5 years that the estimated float expanded.  From December 2011 to December 2014, there was little overall change in the market's float.

Supply is not just limited to the U.S. TrimTabs collects daily ticker-level data on corporate actions and insider trading in selected non-U.S. equity markets, including Germany, Japan, and the U.K. The coverage and history vary by country.

Demand
Demand indicators can be leading or contrary: increasing demand is generally bullish, except when inflows become extremely high.  The main vehicle by which TrimTabs analyzes demand is through its  comprehensive coverage of the flows (money that comes either in and out of funds) and returns of 4,000 U.S. listed mutual funds as well as daily coverage of the flows and returns of all U.S.-listed exchange-traded funds.  In total the firm monitors on a daily basis $3.7 trillion worth of assets from mutual funds and exchange-traded funds because these fund flows can be used as a contrarian indicator in trading strategies.  Other factors that can reflect or influence demand are margin debt, short interest, trends in savings vehicles, equity mutual fund cash levels, commitments of traders data, the VIX, put/call ratios, and investor sentiment surveys.

The TrimTabs Demand Index (TTDI) uses regression analysis of fund flow and sentiment variables for intermediate-term market timing. The index has had an outstanding track record since its launch in September 2008. As of March 2016, the TTDI had outperformed the S&P 500 by a power of 10. The TTDI is one of the ways the firm provides institutional and retail investors with trading strategies and investment insights.

Real-Time Macroeconomics
In addition, TrimTabs also provides a comprehensive assessment of the overall health of the U.S. economy by tracking wage and salary growth and employment growth based on real-time income tax withholdings data from the U.S. Treasury, credit indicators, unemployment claims, surveys of manufacturers and purchasing managers, and housing indicators.

The overall health of the domestic economy is update each week through their TrimTabs Macroeconomic Index (TTMI), a correlation weighted index of 16 leading economic indicators.  It has done an excellent job identifying major economic inflection points.

Proprietary analysis of withheld income and employment tax collections enables TrimTabs to estimate wage and salary growth in real time.  TrimTabs analyzes withholdings on a year-over-year basis without any seasonal adjustments or other statistical manipulation.  TrimTabs’ estimates of wage and salary growth are more timely than the monthly personal income data from the Bureau of Economic Analysis.  TrimTabs also uses withholdings to estimate changes in payroll employment on a monthly basis.

Corporate history
Chairman Charles Biderman founded TrimTabs in Santa Rosa, California in 1990.  He began his career as Alan Abelson's assistant at Barron's after earning an MBA from Harvard Business School.  TrimTabs originally focused on providing stock trading ideas to hedge funds.  Its first recommendation was the short sale of Midlantic National Bank, which traded in the high $20s in January 1990.  Ultimately, Midlantic was taken over at a price of under $10 to save the bank from bankruptcy.

Biderman eventually noticed that no one was tracking money flows into and out of the U.S. stock market on a regular basis.  He began searching for real-time data on money flows of all sorts, including corporate buying and selling, mutual fund flows, and changes in margin debt.  Biderman would develop TrimTabs into the only independent research firm that would provide people with detailed daily coverage of U.S. stock market liquidity.

Corporate America became a heavy net buyer of stock in late 1994, and inflows into stock mutual funds from individuals began to accelerate in 1995. By that time, Biderman realized that TrimTabs’ specialty of short selling was not working well because of the sheer volume of cash flooding into the U.S. stock market from corporate America and individual investors.  In August 1995, he began to analyze U.S. stock market liquidity in what would later become TrimTabs Weekly Liquidity Review.

Biderman's insight and expertise have been widely noted and lauded by the media and institutions alike.  He is a regular on CNBC's Santelli Exchange and Fox Business' Opening Bell with Maria Bartiromo.  TrimTabs pioneering research is widely cited in the media.  Just a few of the financial media outlets which have referenced TrimTabs' work are the Associated Press, Forbes, the Wall Street Journal, the New York Times, Bloomberg, Barron's, Reuters, USA Today, and Marketwatch.

The TrimTabs Float Shrink ETF (NYSE symbol: TTFS)

TrimTabs Asset Management partnered with AdvisorShares to launch the AdvisorShares TrimTabs Float Shrink ETF  on October 4, 2011.  "TTFS is sub-advised by TrimTabs Asset Management ("Portfolio Manager"), a subsidiary of TrimTabs Investment Research (TrimTabs). The Fund seeks to achieve this objective by investing in stocks with liquidity and fundamental characteristics that are historically associated with superior long-term performance. Charles Biderman was the CEO of TrimTabs and a Portfolio Manager for the ETF along with Minyi Chen. Subsequently, TrimTabs has filed with the SEC to launch their own self-indexed ETFs without the aid of AdvisorShares.  On May 26, 2016, AdvisorShares announced that it had removed TrimTabs Asset Management as manager of its TrimTabs Float Shrink ETF , which had about $178 million in assets at the time. AdvisorShares replaced TrimTabs with Wilshire Associates, of Santa Monica, California, but offered no explanation for the change. The name of the fund was changed to the Wilshire Buyback ETF but despite the name change AdvisorShares got to keep the TTFS stock ticker. The TTFS ETF had earned a coveted five-star Morningstar rating by delivering annualized returns of 19.22% as of March 31, 2016. TTFS had also outperformed both the NASDAQ Buyback Achievers Index by 2.2% annually and the Russell 3000 Index by 2.49% annually. "This is insane", TrimTabs CEO Charles Biderman said of the firing, "They came up with no reason, no nothing.” Charles Biderman claimed that it was nearly impossible for Wilshire to replicate TrimTabs stock selection methodology and his first move after the firing was to open a separately managed account with a lower minimum investment and lower fees than TTFS.

Corporate name
TrimTabs takes its name from the trim tab that lies deep within an ocean-going ship. The trim tab is a minuscule rudder that runs the length of the main rudder. To change the ship’s direction, one must first turn the trim tab, and then the main rudder follows.  TrimTabs contends that just as the movement of a trim tab determines the direction of a ship, changes in the trim tabs of liquidity theory are the key to understanding the stock market’s direction.

External links
Official Website

References

Financial services companies of the United States
Companies based in Marin County, California
Financial services companies established in 1990
Privately held companies based in California